As of September 2016, the International Union for Conservation of Nature (IUCN) lists 2,900 least concern reptile species. 56% of all evaluated reptile species are listed as least concern. 
The IUCN also lists two reptile subspecies as least concern.

Of the subpopulations of reptiles evaluated by the IUCN, six species subpopulations have been assessed as least concern.

This is a complete list of least concern reptile species and subspecies evaluated by the IUCN. Species and subspecies which have least concern subpopulations (or stocks) are indicated.

Turtles and tortoises

Species

Subspecies
Brisbane short-necked turtle (Emydura macquarii signata)

Crocodilia species

Tuatara

Cook Strait tuatara (Sphenodon punctatus)

Lizards

There are 1657 species and one subspecies of lizard assessed as least concern.

Anguids

Diplodactylids

Girdled lizards

Chameleons

Plated lizards

Carphodactylids

Anoles

Gekkonids

Wall lizards

Skinks

Species

Subspecies
Egernia stokesii stokesii
Eastern blue-tongued lizard (Tiliqua scincoides scincoides)

Hoplocercin species

Collared lizards

Spectacled lizards

Sphaerodactylids

Night lizards

Teiids

Worm lizards

Neotropical ground lizards

Eublepharids

Dragon lizards

Phyllodactylids

Phrynosomatids

Varanids

Liolaemids

Leiosaurids

Corytophanids

Madagascan iguanas

Other lizard species

Snakes

There are 1192 snake species assessed as least concern.

Pseudoxyrhophiids

Typhlopid blind snakes

Boids

Vipers

Prosymnids

Dipsadids

Xenodermatids

Shield-tailed snakes

Pythons

Elapids

Calamariids

Lamprophiids

Indo-Australian water snakes

Colubrids

Keelbacks

Burrowing asps

Pareatids

Thread snakes

Psammophiids

Pseudoxenodontids

Other snake species

See also 
 Lists of IUCN Red List least concern species
 List of near threatened reptiles
 List of vulnerable reptiles
 List of endangered reptiles
 List of critically endangered reptiles
 List of recently extinct reptiles
 List of data deficient reptiles

References 

Reptiles
Least concern reptiles
Least concern reptiles